Rhegmatorhina is a genus of insectivorous passerine birds in the antbird family, Thamnophilidae.

The genus was introduced by the American ornithologist Robert Ridgway in 1888 with the bare-eyed antbird (Rhegmatorhina gymnops) as the type species. The name of the genus combines the Ancient Greek words rhēgma, rhēgmatos for "fissure" or "cleft" and rhis, rhinos for "nostril".

The genus contains the following species:
 Bare-eyed antbird (Rhegmatorhina gymnops)
 Harlequin antbird (Rhegmatorhina berlepschi)
 White-breasted antbird (Rhegmatorhina hoffmannsi)
 Chestnut-crested antbird (Rhegmatorhina cristata)
 Hairy-crested antbird (Rhegmatorhina melanosticta)

These species are specialist ant-followers that depend upon swarms of army ants to flush insects and other arthropods out of the leaf litter.

References

 
Bird genera
 
Taxa named by Robert Ridgway
Taxonomy articles created by Polbot